
Gmina Lubicz is a rural gmina (administrative district) in Toruń County, Kuyavian-Pomeranian Voivodeship, in north-central Poland.

Villages
Gmina Lubicz contains the villages and settlements of Brzezinko, Brzeźno, Grabowiec, Grębocin, Gronowo, Jedwabno, Józefowo, Kopanino, Krobia, Lubicz, Lubicz Dolny, Lubicz Górny, Mierzynek, Młyniec Drugi, Młyniec Pierwszy, Nowa Wieś, Rogówko, Rogowo and Złotoria.

Neighbouring gminas
Gmina Lubicz is bordered by the city of Toruń and by the gminas of Ciechocin, Kowalewo Pomorskie, Łysomice, Obrowo and Wielka Nieszawka.

References

External links
Polish official population figures 2006

Lubicz
Toruń County